Guru Sishyulu may refer to:

 Guru Sishyulu (1981 film), an Indian Telugu film
 Guru Sishyulu (1990 film), an Indian Telugu film

See also
 Guru Sishyan (disambiguation)
 Guru–shishya tradition
 Guru Shishyaru (disambiguation)